Faisal Ali may refer to:
 Faisal Ali Hassan (born 1981), Emarati footballer
 Faisal Ali (footballer) (born 1999), Indian footballer